Strigatella imperialis (common name: imperial mitre) is a species of sea snail, a marine gastropod mollusk in the family Mitridae, the miters or miter snails.

Description
The shell size varies between 37 mm and 65 mm.

Distribution
This species is distributed in the Red Sea, in the Indian Ocean along the Mascarene Basin and Tanzania; in the Pacific Ocean along Fiji and the Solomons

References

 Spry, J.F. (1961). The sea shells of Dar es Salaam: Gastropods. Tanganyika Notes and Records 56
 Drivas, J. & M. Jay (1988). Coquillages de La Réunion et de l'île Maurice

External links
 Gastropods.com : Mitra (Mitra) imperialis; accessed : 11 December 2010

Mitridae
Gastropods described in 1798